The Jazz Institute of Chicago is a non-profit arts presenting organization that produces jazz concerts and runs educational programs. It was founded in 1969 by a small band of jazz fans, writers, club owners, and musicians to preserve the historical roots of Chicago music and to ensure that the music would still be heard.

Among the founding members were trad pianist Art Hodes, Muhal Richard Abrams, who a few years earlier had also co-founded the Association for the Advancement of Creative Musicians (AACM), Harriett Choice, then music writer for the Chicago Tribune, Joe Segal, owner of The Jazz Showcase, Bob Koester, owner of Delmark Records, Don DeMicheal, drummer and editor of Down Beat magazine, and jazz promoter and supporter Penny Tyler.

External links
 Jazz Institute of Chicago

Non-profit organizations based in Chicago
Music archives in the United States
Jazz organizations